HC CSKA was an ice hockey team in Moscow, Russia. It existed alongside the other HC CSKA Moscow club from 1996-2002.

History
The club was founded on May 14, 1996 by Viktor Tikhonov after he was fired as head coach of HC CSKA Moscow.

The club was promoted to the Russian Superleague following the 2001-02 season. They finished in 17th place in the Superleague the same year and was set to be relegated to the Vysshaya Liga. The club was then disbanded in August 2002 and HC CSKA Moscow took the place of Tikhonov's club in the Superleague.

Results

References

External links
 hccska.narod.ru
 ХРОНОЛОГИЯ РАЗРУШЕНИЯ
 ЦСКА: ВОЗРОЖДАТЬ ТРАДИЦИИ ДОВЕРЕНО ТИХОНОВУ

Defunct ice hockey teams in Russia
CSKA Moscow
Military ice hockey teams